Aurat Raj is one of first Pakistani feminist film. Released in 1979, it was produced and directed by Rangeela. It is a satirical movie and was produced during the  grim times for women under the conservative dictator, General Zia-ul-Haq's, socio-politically adverse  dictatorship. Ahead of its time, it did not do well commercially at the box office.

The plot is based on a short story of Shaukat Thanvi, where oppressed women of Pakistan fight back by forming a feminist movement on roads and gain political power too. After gaining political power, in a satirical  comedy fantasy scene, the female lead gives a taste of patriarchy and misogyny to Pakistani men by converting all of them into women a time. The fantastical scenarios, musical flights and comedic twists in the film have been hailed as interventionist tools and techniques that help to complicate and refashion the present by envisioning radical futures.

Cast 
 Rani 
 Waheed Murad
 Sultan Rahi
  Chakori 
  Naghma 
  Shehla Gill Rangeela 
  Yasmin Khan 
  Badar Munir 
  Asif Khan 
  Usman Pirzada 
  Khanum 
  Waheeda Khan 
  Surayya Khan 
  Nazar 
  Nanha 
  Albela 
  Khalid Saleem Mota 
  Iqbal Durrani 
  Irfan Khoost 
  Ali Ahmed 
  Ladla 
  Chakram 
  Saqi 
  Shahnawaz 
  (Guests: Yousuf Khan, Ali Ejaz, Durdana Rehman, Zahid Khan)

Box office
The film was a "Silver Jubilee" hit, completing 45 weeks in theaters.

See also 
 Aurat March
 Me too movement in Pakistan 
 Girls at Dhabas

References

External links

Urdu-language Pakistani films
Pakistani action films
1970s feminist films
Feminism in Pakistan
1970s Urdu-language films